WZRA-CD, UHF digital channel 15, is a low-powered, Class A television station in the Tampa Bay area, reaching to ethnic groups in Pinellas, southwestern Pasco and northwestern Hillsborough counties. The station carries a variety of mostly news-oriented programming from broadcasters outside the United States, in several languages.

In Pinellas County, WZRA is available on WOW! cable TV channel 122 and on Spectrum digital channel 948. WZRA is also on channel 24 on Verizon FiOS throughout the market, as far south as Sarasota County. The station also offers a live feed of its programming on the Internet.

Programming

Most of WZRA's programming is Greek, aimed for the Greek audience in Tarpon Springs, but the channel also offers programming in other languages, such as Italian and English.

WZRA also presents daily newscasts from Greece (from ERT), which (reflecting the station's Greek ownership) makes up the majority of the station's evening, overnight and Sunday programming. The station carries programs from the national broadcasters in Russia (RT) and Italy (RAI) as well as local news from Newfoundland's NTV, aimed at Canadian "snowbirds." WZRA carried CTV Television Network newscasts in the early 21st century; they also carried Dini Petty's CTV talk show, via NTV, until CTV cancelled the series' repeats in the early-2000s. The station carries general entertainment programs from Youtoo America during the morning hours between Monday and Saturday.

History

When the station signed on the late-1990s, channel 48 went by the translator-style call sign W48AY, and used the moniker "Bay TV". When the station became a Class A station in the early 2000s, the call sign changed to WZRA-CA, though at present, it is unknown for what the call sign meant, or if they were randomly chosen by the FCC.

WZRA originally had its transmitter in Oldsmar, broadcasting at 41.7 kW. They since relocated to a 150 kW transmitter, broadcasting from facilities near the corner of US 19 and Palmetto Road in Port Richey, increasing coverage in west Pasco and southwestern Hernando counties, but reducing coverage in Hillsborough and central Pinellas. They have since filed a construction permit to flash cut channel 48 to a digital signal, still broadcasting from Port Richey, but at 15 kW.  On July 8, 2015, this construction permit was granted.

As of April 2017, WZRA-CD only broadcast programming on Channel 48-3.

Bright House dispute in Tarpon Springs
Until mid-February 2006, WZRA was seen on Bright House channel 15 in the Tarpon Springs area. But on that date, WZRA was unceremoniously replaced with Tarpon Springs' local government channel, which, at its debut, was mainly a promo loop for an upcoming municipal election, plus live City Commission meetings.

Prior to December 2007 (when all local public service channels moved to the digital tier), Bright House allocated channel 15 for local Government-access television in Pinellas County, and had given that slot to WZRA on an interim basis, until Tarpon Springs started their own channel. And with WZRA being a low-powered station, Bright House is not obligated to carry the channel.

Since being dropped, WZRA received thousands of calls in support of the station, especially from the Greek community. Support was so huge, WZRA's station manager Angelos Angelatos urged their viewers to call Bright House, as well as call its Vice-President, Mike Robertson, direct.

Angelatos and his brother, talk show host Sam Angelatos, said that Bright House's discontinuation of WZRA was a form of discrimination, favoring the Hispanic community with four Spanish channels, while ignoring and mistreating other ethnic groups.

In July 2006, Bright House gave WZRA a permanent home, on digital channel 948 in Northern Pinellas County. WZRA was slated to be dropped from Bright House by the end of April 2011; however, as of March 2014, the station is still part of the Bright House line-up. But despite the transmitter relocation to Port Richey, in Pasco County, WZRA is still available only to Bright House subscribers in Northern Pinellas.

See also
 WPSO and WXYB, radio sister stations of WZRA

References

External links

 Greek Voice

CTV Television Network stations
Non-English-language television stations in Florida
Greek-American culture in Florida
Greek-language television stations
German-American culture in Florida
German-language television stations
Italian-American culture in Florida
Italian-language television stations
ZRA-CD
Foreign-language television stations in the United States
1990s establishments in Florida